{{Infobox casino
| logo            = This_is_the_logo_for_Viejas_Casino_%26_Resort.jpg
| image           = Viejas_Casino_Alpine_California_01.jpg
| image_caption   = The exterior of the Viejas casino.
| location        = Alpine, California
| address         = 5000 Willows Road
| date_opened     = September 13, 1991
| date_closed     = 
| theme           = 
| rooms           = 237
| space_gaming    = 
| shows           = 
| attractions     = Outlet mall  Bowling Alley
| notable_restaurants   = The Grove SteakhouseThe Cafe at Viejas''The Buffet at ViejasWillows Coffee Bar
| casino_type     = Land-based
| owner           = Viejas Band of Kumeyaay Indians
| renovations     = 200720132015
| website         = viejas.com
| footnotes       = 
}}Viejas Casino and Resort''' is a hotel casino and outlet center owned by the Viejas Band of Kumeyaay Indians, located in Alpine, California. The casino has over 2,000 slot machines, up to 86 table games, three restaurants, a deli, bingo, an off-track betting facility, lounge, concert venues and multiple indoor and outdoor meeting spaces. Opened in March 2013, the original hotel had 128 rooms; an expansion was completed in October 2015 with the opening of an additional hotel tower with 109 deluxe rooms and luxury suites increasing hotel accommodations to a total of 237 rooms and suites.

History 

In 1932, The Viejas Band of Kumeyaay Indians purchased the reservation with their share of proceeds from a forced eviction from the area now containing El Capitan Reservoir. The Viejas tribe is one of seven California tribes that signed a modified compact with Governor Arnold Schwarzenegger granting unlimited slot machines in return for higher payments to the state.

In 1977, the Viejas Bingo Room opened in the Ma Tar Awa RV Park on the Viejas reservation. The Viejas Casino opened its doors on September 13, 1991. The bingo room was moved inside the casino from the RV resort in 1994. Six years later, a new bingo room was built east of the casino. In 2006, a $19 million project to remodel the casino was completed.

In 2007, the Viejas tribe announced an $800 million expansion project including a second casino, hotel, and parking garage. That expansion project was never completed, but as of November 17, 2015, the Viejas Casino and Resort has a newly renovated non-smoking casino area, a 5-story parking garage, and an expanded section of the hotel which was officially opened on October 30, 2015. A poker room was added in early 2016 but was later removed. The addition of a new hotel is expected to be completed by the January 2018. The new hotel tower will be adults only (21+) and have 159 suites. A spa and saltwater pool will also be included.

Hotel 
On August 31, 2011, the Viejas tribe announced plans to add a 150-room luxury hotel to the casino.  Plans were scaled back slightly resulting in a 5-story hotel with 128 rooms consisting of 99 deluxe rooms and 29 luxury suites. The $36 million project broke ground in early 2012 and the building was topped out in November 2012. Hotel construction was completed in March 2013 with the grand opening celebration held on March 21, 2013. Viejas describes the hotel as "modern amenities, streamlined design and handcrafted, boutique feel". The original hotel includes a business center, fitness center, and resort style pool with VIP cabanas.

As part of the original hotel construction project both east and west entrances to the casino were remodeled and valet parking was moved from the east entrance to the west entrance. Additional valet parking was made available at the hotel entrance when the hotel opened. Bingo was moved into a new 340-seat bingo hall inside the casino and the former bingo hall was razed to make room for the hotel. The east entrance was enlarged and extended to connect the hotel to the casino and the buffet was remodeled and expanded. The buffet is the only restaurant that allows children and persons under the age of 21. Those under 21 are not permitted anywhere else in the casino.

With the hotel opening, Viejas was renamed from Viejas Casino to Viejas Casino & Resort. Since its opening in 2013, Viejas Casino & Resort has received the AAA Four Diamond Award consecutively each year.

In February 2013 a Tribal Environmental Impact Report was filed for construction of a 6-story parking structure with capacity for up to 1,000 vehicles to be built on the north side of the casino. The parking garage would provide additional parking for both the casino and hotel. Construction was started in April 2013 and the parking structure opened on November 21, 2013.

In 2014, the casino underwent a year-long development project to include a 15,000 square foot expansion of their gaming floor, an additional five-story hotel tower and renovated non-smoking casino areas. 

The extended casino floor allowed for the addition of another 1,000 slot machines, while the new hotel tower increased accommodations. This expansion created an additional 50,000 square feet of indoor and outdoor multifunction resort space, and increased hotel accommodations to a total of 237 rooms and suites.

In 2016, Viejas Casino & Resort began another development project with the construction of a third hotel tower named the Willows Hotel & Spa. The newest addition is open to guests age 21 and older and has 159 suites, a saltwater pool, two new restaurants, outdoor dining and a day spa and salon.

Dining 
Viejas Casino & Resort features several restaurants and eateries throughout the casino, hotel and outlets.

See also 
 
 Viejas Arena - formerly known as Cox Arena, the on-campus arena of San Diego State University
 Kumeyaay

References

Casinos completed in 1991
Kumeyaay
Buildings and structures in San Diego
Native American casinos
Casinos in San Diego County, California
Casino hotels
1991 establishments in California
Hotels established in 2013
Native American history of California